San Clemente station is a station on the Inland Empire–Orange County and Orange County Lines of the Metrolink commuter rail system around Los Angeles, California. It opened on March 6, 1995 as an infill station.

Hours and frequency

See also 
San Clemente Pier station

References

External links 

Metrolink stations in Orange County, California
Railway stations in the United States opened in 1995